The President of the Senate of the Parliament of the Czech Republic is the presiding officer of the Senate, the upper house of the Parliament of the Czech Republic and also the second-highest-ranking official of the Czech Republic, after the president.

The position is provided for by Article 29 of the Constitution of the Czech Republic. The Senate elects one of its members as president at the start of each new term, or whenever the position is vacant.

As a custom, the strongest party in the Senate usually chooses the president.

See also 
Senate of the Czech Republic
List of presidents of the Senate of the Czech Republic

External links 
Profile of Miloš Vystrčil at the Senate official website